The Ranvir Sena is a militia functioning as a landlord group, mainly based in the state of Bihar, India. The group was formed by Bhumihar landlords in 1994, with the aim to counter the influence of various left-wing militants, Naxalite groups and the Communist Party of India (Marxist–Leninist) Liberation in central Bihar. The Ranvir Sena has been connected to a number of massacres including the massacre at Laxmanpur Bathe. It has, on several occasions, been accused of human rights abuses. The Bihar state government banned the Ranvir Sena in July 1995, but the group continue to remain active. The group has frequently publicly claimed responsibility for its crimes with impunity.

History

According to Professor Ashwani Kumar, the "origin of the Ranvir Sena is shrouded in mystery... [but] it is fair to assume that the Bhumihars in Belaur village in Bhojpur district" in 1994. The name Ranvir comes from Ranvir Baba, an iconic local hero of the Bhumihar caste and Sena is a Hindi word meaning 'army'. As the legend goes, during the late 19th century, Ranvir Choudhary, a retired military man and a resident of Belaur village in Bhojpur district, protected the rights of the Bhumihar, a land-owing upper caste of the State, against the domination of the Rajputs. Due to the activities of Ranvir Baba, the Bhumihars asserted their power in Bhojpur district and established regional supremacy of the Bhumihars.

Rang Bahadur Singh was the first president of Ranvir Sena. He came from Ichari village, Jagdishpur, Bihar. Brahmeshwar Singh of Khopira became the group's leader a few months after it was formed.

Brahmeshwar Singh was killed by unidentified gunmen on 1 June 2012 while on his morning walk in the Bhojpur district headquarters of Arrah. He was facing life imprisonment for coordinating various massacres but was acquitted and released from jail in April 2012. A day-long curfew was clamped on Ara as tension escalated following his murder. Prohibitory orders under section 144 CrPC were also enforced in the district.

Police and politician involvement
Some politicians are members of Ranvir Sena and some policemen have helped them on their raids. For example, in a Ranvir Sena raid in Ekwari, a village in Bihar, in April 1997, policemen opened the doors of Dalit villagers so the Ranvir Sena could go inside instead of protecting the villagers as they were supposed to. Chandradeo Prasad Verma, former member of Janata Dal and Member of Parliament for Arrah, put legalising the Ranvir Sena as one of his campaign points in the 1998 Lok Sabha elections.

In 2015, in a media sting operation, evidence came to light that BJP leaders, including Murli Manohar Joshi and C. P. Thakur and the former PM Chandra Shekhar were complicit in the Bihar Dalit massacres committed by the Ranvir Sena, further Lalu Prasad's RJD set up the Amir Das Commission, after the Laxmanpur Bathe massacre. The mandate of the commission was to inquire if there were any links between political parties and the Ranvir Sena. The Nitish Kumar government abruptly disbanded the commission in 2006, just before it was to submit its report. It is strongly believed that the commission's findings were going to demonstrate firm links between the Ranvir Sena, the JD(U) and the BJP .

Mass killings
On 11 July 1996, 21 Dalits were slaughtered by the Ranvir Sena in Bathani Tola, Bhojpur district. Among the dead were 11 women, six children and three infants. The perpetrators targeted women and children in particular, so as to deter any future resistance. Three people were sentenced to death and 20 sentenced to life imprisonment in 2010 for participating in the massacre, but the Patna High Court acquitted all 23 in April 2012.

Ranvir Sena killed 10 workers in Haibaspur on 23 March 1997. They wrote the name of the organisation in blood on the village well before they left. Most of the people Ranvir Sena killed that night belonged to families allegedly supporting Party Unity, a communist group.

On 1 December 1997, sena members killed 63 Dalits–16 children, 27 women and 18 men–using guns in Laxmanpur-Bathe. The dead included 5 teenage girls who had been raped and mutilated before being shot, and 8 people from the Mallah community who had ferried Ranvir Sena members across the Son River before and after the attack.

On 25 January 1999, there was a massacre of 22 Dalit men, women and children by Ranvir Sena in the village of Shankarbigha, Jehanabad due to their alleged Naxalite allegiance and to establish the supremacy of landlords. Another massacre followed two weeks later in the neighboring village of Narayanpur, where Ranvir Sena killed twelve villagers belonging to the Chamar community.

In June 2000, Ranvir Sena was alleged to be behind the attack, carried out using automatic weapons, on the lower-caste Yadav villagers of Miapur, Aurangabad district in Bihar. 22 people died immediately and the rest succumbed to their injuries. The victims included six minors. 18 were injured included 10 critically. This was speculated to be a revenge attack after the killings of 11 upper-caste villagers.

Organisation
Brahmeshwar Singh 'Mukhiya', the founder chief of the Ranvir Sena, on whose head the authorities had placed a reward of half a million Indian rupees, was the Supreme Commander of the Ranvir Sena until he was arrested in Patna on 29 August 2002 to face a number of criminal cases, which included those related to massacres.

Initial reports said that Shamsher Bahadur Singh was, on 7 September 2002, appointed a new chief of the Ranvir Sena. However, according to a report of 25 December 2002, the chief of the Ranvir Sena was Bhuar Thakur until he was arrested with his two associates on 24 December 2002 near Karnol bridge on the Patna-Sasaram road in Charpokhri, Bhojpur.

Rashtravadi Kisan Sangathan is the political wing formed to take part in the 2004 elections. The Ranvir Mahila Sangh, a women's wing, has also been created. Its members too have been trained in arms use.

On 8 July 2011, Brahmeshwar Singh was released on bail after serving 9 years in jail awaiting trial for 17 cases, including those related to Dalit carnages in Bihar. He had earlier been granted bail in 16 other cases. On 5 May 2012, Singh floated a non-electoral outfit named Akhil Bharatiya Rashtravadi Kisan Sangathan. However, he was shot dead less than a month later, on 1 June 2012, by unidentified gunmen in the town of Ara.

See also 
Bhumi Sena
Lorik Sena
Kuer Sena
Ashok Mahto gang
Dalelchak-Bhagaura Massacre 1987

References 

Crime in Bihar
Far-right politics in India
Anti-communism in India
Paramilitary organisations based in India
Caste-related violence in India
Indian anti-communists
1994 establishments in Bihar
Politics of Bihar
Military units and formations established in 1994
Non-military counterinsurgency organizations
Indigenous counterinsurgency forces
Private armies
Caste-related violence in Bihar